The Chinese Taipei national under-16 and under-17 basketball team is a national basketball team of Chinese Taipei, administered by the Chinese Taipei Basketball Association.
It represents the country in international under-16 and under-17 (under age 16 and under age 17) basketball competitions.

See also
Chinese Taipei national basketball team
Chinese Taipei national under-19 basketball team
Chinese Taipei women's national under-17 basketball team

References

External links
 Archived records of Chinese Taipei team participations

U-17
Men's national under-17 basketball teams